James R. Davila (born 1960) is an American biblical scholar. He is Professor of Early Jewish Studies and former Principal of St Mary's College, St Andrews. A specialist in Second Temple Judaism and Old Testament Pseudepigrapha, Davila is a Participant at the Enoch seminar and a member of the Advisory Board of the Journal Henoch.

Education
Davila received his B.A. from the University of California, Los Angeles in 1982, his M.A. from the same institution in 1983, and his Ph.D from Harvard University in 1988. All degrees were awarded summa cum laude. His doctoral thesis was entitled "Unpublished Pentateuchal Manuscripts from Cave IV, Qumran: 4QGenExa, Genb-h, Genj-k". He was elevated to Professor of Early Jewish Studies at St Mary's College, University of St Andrews in May 2008.

Screen Credit

Davila has one television and one movie credit to his name. Davila was credited as Jimmy Davila during his acting career. He appeared in one episode of The Walton's in 1973 called "The Fawn" where he portrayed Harold Beasley. He appeared  in the 1975 movie "The Hindenburg" where his character "Flakus" was uncredited.

Publications
Davila has authored, contributed, or edited numerous books and articles.

Books

References

External links

 PaleoJudaica.com: A weblog on ancient Judaism and its context, Davila's blog
 Enoch Seminar website
 Journal Henoch website

American biblical scholars
Scottish scholars and academics
Religion academics
University of California, Los Angeles alumni
Harvard University alumni
Academics of the University of St Andrews
Judaic studies
1960 births
Living people